Teodoro Rojas Vera (25 September 1877, Asunción – 3 September 1954) was a Paraguayan botanist.

Early life and education
Born in Asunción, he was the son of Jose M. Rojas and Dolores Vera. He studied at national schools in Pilar and Limpio. In 1897, he went to Europe, studying at the School of Arts and Crafts in Aarau, Switzerland.

Career
Rojas returned to Paraguay and from 1900 to 1915 was curator of the "", the herbarium collection of Swiss botanist, Emil Hassler. In 1906 he participated in an expedition to the Pilcomayo region, the collections from which formed the basis of Hassler's 1909 publication, Flora Pilcomayensis.

In 1916 he was appointed head of the herbarium and museum of natural history of the Botanical Garden and Zoo of Asunción where he worked for many years. During this time he continued to undertake regular expeditions collecting specimens of Paraguayan flora which he exchanged with other international collections and visitors to Asunción.

He worked closely with the Miguel Lillo Institute, Tucumán.

Botanical eponymy 
 Rojasia, circumscribed by Gustaf Oskar Andersson Malme in 1905.
 Rojasiophyton, circumscribed by Emil Hassler in 1910.

References

External links 

1877 births
1954 deaths
Paraguayan botanists
People from Asunción